The  is a botanical garden operated by Kanazawa University. It is located at the university's Kakuma Campus in Kakuma-machi, Kanazawa, Ishikawa, Japan.

The garden was established in 1949, and in 1995 moved to its current location. Its mission is to advance botanical research and education, and to conserve genetic resources. It publishes the "Annual report of Botanic Garden, Faculty of Science, Kanazawa University".

See also 
 List of botanical gardens in Japan

References 
 Facilities of the Institute of Nature and Environmental Technology, Kanazawa University
 History of the Institute of Nature and Environmental Technology, Kanazawa University

Botanical gardens in Japan
Gardens in Ishikawa Prefecture
Kanazawa University